Beerayya or Bheerappa is a God of Kuruma community in India. This community celebrates Beerayya Patnalu Which is celebration of God Beerayya Marriage for every 5 or 7 or 9 years. Beerollu are the traditional priests of kuruma or Kuruba Community and perform the marriage of Beerayya with Kamaraathi.

Temple
Kuruma or Kuruba is a caste in Telangana and Andhra Pradesh. Kuruma people worship Beeraiah as their caste god. Kuruma's celebrate the festival called Beerayya Patnalu which is a celebration like Jathara every 5-10 years. This is the biggest festival in the kuruma community. Relatives, near and far and guests are invited to this festival.

Beeraiah Patnalu
Beeraayya Patnalu is celebrated for 7 days.  Events include Pochamma Bonalu, Mailalu, Ganga Bonam or Jaldi, bonalu, Beerayya Marriage, Sarugu, Post marriage Oggu Katha, and Garadi.

See also
Biroba

References

Social groups of India